Bramsche is a railway station located in Bramsche, Germany. The station is located on the Oldenburg–Osnabrück railway and the train services are operated by NordWestBahn.

Train services
The station is served by the following services:

Regional services  Osnabrück - Bramsche - Cloppenburg - Oldenburg - Varel - Wilhelmshaven
Local services  Osnabrück - Bramsche - Vechta - Delmenhorst - Bremen

References

External links
 
 Freight Train at Bramsche

Railway stations in Lower Saxony